Belonia is a town and municipal council in South Tripura district, Tripura, India. It is also the headquarters of South Tripura District. It is linked with Agartala (the state capital) by National Highway 108A from Belonia to Jolaibari and via National Highway 8 from Jolaibari to Agartala. Belonia lies on the border with Bangladesh.

Geography

It has an average elevation of 23 metres (75 feet).

Demographics
At the 2011 India census, Belonia Municipal Council had a population of 19,996. Males constituted 52% of the population and females 48%. Belonia had an average literacy rate of 95%, higher than the national average of 59.5%; with 54% of males and 46% of females literate. 9% of the population was under 6 years of age.

Education
Schools:
 Belonia Vidyapith H/S School
 Brajendra Kishore Institution
 Arya Colony H/S School
 S.B.C Nagar H/S School
 Barpathari H/S School
 Brindaban Royaja Para High School, Chittamara, Belonia
 Manurmukh High School
 Amjadnagar High School
 Belonia Govt. English Medium H.S. School
Belonia Girls H.S. School
Satmura S.B School
Ganoyday S.B School
South Mirzapur High School
North Belonia High School 
East Mirjapur High School 
Colleges:
 Iswar Chandra Vidyasagar College
 ITI College

Places of interest 

 Trishna Wildlife Sanctuary
 Yogmaya Temple, Kalibari
 Indo-Bangla Custom Checkpost
 Raj Rajeswari Temple, Muhuripur
 Muhurichar river island
 Muhuripur Fishery near Bamchara
 Bharat - Bangladesh Maitri Uddyan (Chottakhola, under Rajnagar RD Block). It is a memorable place for the liberation war of Bangladesh in 1971 AD.
 Eco park. It is located at Baroj colony under Belonia Municipal Area

Belonia railway station 
A railway service in Belonia (code: BENA) serve up to Agartala (code: AGTL), Service started from February 2019. Right now  everyday (except Sunday), 2 pairs of trains run between Belonia and Agartala. The station lies on the Agartala - Sabroom rail section, which comes under the Lumding railway division of the Northeast Frontier Railway. The segment from Agartala to Sabroom via Udaipur became operational on  3 October 2019, with a proposed elevation of 39m.

Integrated Check Post (ICP) 
Belonia Railway station here at border of India will have Integrated Check Post for immigration and customs and will connect Indian railway network 120 km away with Chittagong port in Bangladesh via Feni.

Civic Administration
The city is represented by the Belonia constituency in Tripura's legislative assembly whose MLA is Arun Chandra Bhaumik.

In the Indian parliament, Belonia is represented by the Tripura West Lok Sabha constituency, whose Member of Parliament is Pratima Bhoumik.

See also
 Amarpur
 Chittamara, Belonia
 Kailashahar
 Khumulwng
 List of cities and towns in Tripura
 Teliamura

References

Cities and towns in South Tripura district
South Tripura district